The Yiyuan Rong Cave Group is a cluster of
Ordovician limestone caves in the area under the administration of the city of Zibo, Shandong Province, China. Rong Cave proper is the namesake of the cave group. The cave group contains more than 40 caves in total and is the largest cluster of limestone caves in China north of the Yangtze River. It covers an area of approximately 10 square kilometers. Other major caves in the group are Thousand-Men Cave,
Resting Cave, 
Stone-Dragon Cave, 
Xuanyun Cave, 
Nine-Skies Cave, 
Coral Cave, 
Lingzhi Cave (after the Lingzhi mushroom), 
Shenxian Cave, and Xiaya Cave. The Thousand-Men Cave was used as an arsenal by the Eighth Route Army from September 1938 to March 1939. Some of the major caves in the group have been made accessible to tourists as they are popular attractions.

References

Landforms of Shandong
Tourist attractions in Shandong
Caves of Shandong